The King of Fighters All Star is a beat 'em up role-playing game developed by Netmarble Games and published by SNK. It was first released in Japan on July 26, 2018, for the iOS and Android. The game is a retelling of SNK's The King of Fighters games with the player being able to create their own team as they battle across multiple annual tournaments. It was released in English regions on October 22, 2019. A Microsoft Windows version is also available, starting from its beta version in February 10, 2022.

Gameplay

The game is a beat 'em up with elements of a role-playing game, similar to River City Ransom and its spiritual successors River City Ransom: Underground and River City Girls. The player controls one character as he engages multiple enemies until reaching the boss of the stage. The character possesses normal techniques and special moves as well as Desperation Moves. The last two cannot be used consecutively as the player is given time to prepare for the next usage of the move. When first playing, the game offers the player a choice of the characters Kyo Kusanagi, Terry Bogard and Ryo Sakazaki. However, upon passing the first stage, the player can select randomly new characters developed by SNK. All characters carry a number of stars depending on how strong they can become and from what title they originate. For example, the first Kyo is his incarnation from The King of Fighters '94 but can be replaced by other incarnations of Kyo who possess more stars. Every time a stage is cleared, the player obtains different types of objects for multiple purposes such as increasing experience and raising stats, as well as rubies to summon more characters or restore their health.

The game often offers alternative versions of the characters that can only be obtained through events such as Halloween versions of Yashiro Nanakase or Kula Diamond.

Each of the characters and one of their variants have different border classes aside Bronze, Silver and Gold, which are Purple and Red Borders. Although FES-type Purple variant fighters can be leveled up further with regular dimension exchange, both Boss Syndrome and Special Signature counterparts of the border, as well EX/Red border can only level up with a dimensional exchange based on their represented variant borders.

Development and promotion
The game was first announced in Chokaigi 2017 where the developers stated they would bring the franchise composed of fighting games to role-playing games. The first teaser was released in May 2018. Global version manager Ying Chen states that the developers aimed for players to make their own types of teams per preference. In regards to the timing between the original Eastern and Western versions, Chen said that the developers wanted Westerns to receive the same treatment. SNK wanted to create a mobile game offering fun of control. They focused on letting our players to enjoy multiple combination and powerful sense of hitting through simple moves. The cards were added in order to provide a sort of strategic feeling. It was developed be appealed by a wide range of players. In order to make the game stand within other mobile phone games, the team added multiplayer options, something rare in the market. SNK stated that Netmarble already had a large experience within mobile phone games worldwidely and wanted them to continue with this tradition.

The translation from the fighting game system to a side-scrolling game was felt be well executed by the developers. The game was created with the Unity engine with SNK wishing to create appealing graphics in the process. While the game offers the player the idea of buying different features, the company wanted to still give them freedom in regards to what they could do. The development team worked to make everything seem unique, that the basic attacks seem like signature moves. Writer Akihiko Ureshino stated SNK will not use characters from the EX spin-off games from the Game Boy Advance and instead Maximum Impact characters from the PlayStation 2 as the former were noted to be less popular than the latter.

All Star has made crossovers with other series:
 One is Samurai Shodown, another franchise by SNK involving Haohmaru, Genjuro Kibagami, Ukyo Tachibana, Charlotte Christine de Cold, Rimururu and Shiro Tokisada Amakusa. In promoting the cellphone game, Kyo was portrayed by Yuichi Nakamura for a commercial alongside Hiroshi Fujioka as Haohmaru. Nakamura reflects enjoying this work due to admiring his superiors, most notably Fujioka. Due to already being part of the base game, Nakoruru was not included, so would The King of Fighters XV variant of Haohmaru and Samurai Shodown (2019) newcomer Darli Dagger, due to the two latter's upcoming inclusions with the former via DLC in the fifteenth KOF game.
 The next one is Hideaki Sorachi's Shueisha manga series Gin Tama in October 2018. For this promotion, the characters of Gintoki Sakata, Kagura, Shinsuke Takasugi, Isao Kondo, Sougo Okita, Toshiro Hijikata appeared as guest characters. The Gin Tama collaboration made its return in July 2020, making its debut on the Global version, with four more characters from Gin Tama being added: Gintoki Sakata in his "White Yaksha" variant, Kamui, Kotarou Katsura, and Elizabeth.
 In July 2019, Jin Kazama (also his Tekken 6 version), Heihachi Mishima and Kazuya Mishima from Bandai Namco's Tekken series were revealed to be playable characters in the game. More characters from Tekken were revealed and made their debut in November 2019 including Armor King II, Paul Phoenix and Ling Xiaoyu (also her Tekken: Blood Vengeance version). The second wave in August 2022 adds Nina Williams (also her Tekken 5 version), Devil Jin, Hwoarang (also his Tekken 6 version) and Alisa Bosconovitch.
 In May 2020, Dwayne “The Rock” Johnson (also his "People's Champion" variant), Mark "The Undertaker" Calaway, John Cena (also his "Thuganomics Doctor" variant), Seth Rollins, Kofi Kingston, and Rebecca "Becky Lynch" Quinn from WWE were revealed to be playable characters in the game, with Michael Cole as the announcer for the players who picked one of the WWE wrestlers as their chosen fighter(s). Shin Hwa Cho from Netmarble expressed excitement in regards to this collaboration as it would appeal to newcomers to the series. Brian Flinn from WWE shared similar feelings as it would popularize the wrestlers throughout the game.
 In November 2020, KOF All-Star made a new crossover with Seven Knights, a Netmarble's original franchise, where Rudy, Rachel Agni, Eileene Heron, "Dellons" Snolled Black Scythe, and Shane were revealed to be playable characters in the game.
 In March 2021, the main characters from Nakaba Suzuki's Kodansha manga series The Seven Deadly Sins, Meliodas (also his "Tavern Master" variant), Elizabeth Liones (also her "Dancer" variant), Diane, Ban, King Harlequin, and Merlin, were revealed to be playable characters in the game.
 In July 2021, Kasumi, Marie Rose, Nyotengu, and Honoka, along with their revealing variants, the "Angel Paradise" from Koei Tecmo's Dead or Alive (and directly, a modern reboot series of Ninja Gaiden) were revealed.
 In November 2021, Sol Badguy, May, Baiken, Dizzy, I-No, and Ramlethal Valentine from Arc System Works's Guilty Gear were revealed.
 In February 2022, the veterans of Capcom's Street Fighter titles, Ryu, Chun-Li (also her Street Fighter Alpha variant), Akuma and M. Bison, as well as a recently introduced new protagonist for Street Fighter 6 Luke Sullivan were revealed. Prior to the crossover storyline, Akuma appeared earlier as a non-playable cameo in Orochi Saga Boss Syndrome's Out of Control Rush Event storyline prior to the beginning of the crossover event on March 24, 2022, until April 14, 2022.
 In December 2022, Cassandra Alexandra (also her Soulcalibur IV variant), Seong Mi-na, Ivy Valentine (also her alternate costume variant from Soulcalibur V), and Taki from another Bandai Namco fighting game series, Soulcalibur, were revealed. This crossover was made after Haohmaru, who guest appeared in Soulcalibur VI via DLC season 2 to promote Samurai Shodown (2019), made his KOF debut in The King of Fighters XV via DLC Team Pass as well, then eventually being added to this game.

Reception
All Star got a 16 out of 20 by Jeux Video. Multiplayer scored it a 7.3 out of 10. Kotaku praised the presentation and gameplay but noted that the usage of microtransactions might leave players with mixed thoughts in regards to the need of collecting as many fighters they want.

All Star also made it to Apple's Best of 2019.

References

External links

2018 video games
Android (operating system) games
Crossover beat 'em ups
SNK beat 'em ups
Gacha games
IOS games
Windows games
The King of Fighters games
Video games developed in South Korea
WWE video games
Street Fighter games
Netmarble games
Single-player video games